Rahul Subhash Kul is a politician from Rahu, Daund, Pune Maharashtra. He has been elected in Maharashtra Legislative Assembly election in 2014 from Daund constituency as candidate of Rashtriya Samaj Paksha. In 2019 assembly election he again won as BJP candidate defeating rival NCP's Ramesh Thorat. His late father Subhash Kul was three time MLA from Daund while his mother Ranjana Kul is one time MLA from Daund. He succeeded his mother in 2014 General election defeating NCP's Ramesh Thorat.

References 

Living people
Bharatiya Janata Party politicians from Maharashtra
Nationalist Congress Party politicians from Maharashtra
Maharashtra MLAs 2014–2019
Rashtriya Samaj Paksha politicians
Year of birth missing (living people)
People from Pune district